David Henry Rutley (born 7 March 1961) is a British politician who has served as the Member of Parliament (MP) for Macclesfield since 2010. A member of the Conservative Party, has been Parliamentary Under-Secretary of State for Americas and Caribbean since October 2022.

Early life and career

David Henry Rutley was born in Gravesham, Kent in March 1961. He was educated at the comprehensive Priory School, Lewes before going on to study at the London School of Economics and Harvard Business School. He spent most of his career in business and worked as a senior executive in major companies including Asda (where he ran home shopping and e-commerce), PepsiCo International, Halifax General Insurance and Barclays.

A one time advisor to cabinet minister William Waldegrave in the early 1990s, Rutley worked as a special adviser from 1994 to 1996 in John Major's Conservative government at the Treasury, Cabinet Office and Ministry of Agriculture, Fisheries and Food. During this time, Rutley helped shape the Budget and initiate the first ever White Paper for rural England.

Political career
Rutley stood unsuccessfully as the Conservative parliamentary candidate for St Albans at the 1997 general election. He was first elected to Parliament at the 2010 general election for the Conservative-held seat of Macclesfield.

In July 2010, Rutley was elected to the Treasury Select Committee and served on the committee until his appointment in November 2010 as Parliamentary Private Secretary to Damian Green, Minister of State for Immigration. When Green left office in the 2014 reshuffle, Rutley became PPS to David Lidington at the Foreign Office. He has served as the Co-Chairman of the All Party Parliamentary Group (APPG) on Mountaineering, the Chairman of the British-Danish APPG, secretary of both the APPG national parks and the APPG for Mountain Rescue, and an officer for the APPG on management. He has also been a member of other APPGs, including those on: China, Pharmaceuticals and Financial Education for Young People.

Rutley was opposed to Brexit prior to the 2016 EU membership referendum.

In June 2017, Rutley was appointed a Lord Commissioner of the Treasury, making him a government whip. From September 2018 to June 2019, Rutley was appointed Parliamentary Under-Secretary of State at the Department for Environment, Food and Rural Affairs, in addition to his role as a whip. This followed an interim appointment as Parliamentary Under-Secretary in the same department from 22 May 2018, during Thérèse Coffey's recovery from illness.

On 17 September 2021, Rutley was appointed Parliamentary Under-Secretary of State at the Department for Work and Pensions during the second cabinet reshuffle of the second Johnson ministry.

Personal life
Rutley is married to his wife, Rachel, a physiotherapist, with whom he has 4 children. Rutley is a member of the Church of Jesus Christ of Latter-day Saints (LDS Church). Rutley served as an LDS Church missionary in the North of England from 1979 to 1981.

Outside politics, he is a keen mountaineer and has climbed in mountain ranges throughout the world. He also enjoys fishing, and bird watching. Although not a player, he is the honorary vice-president of the Ash Tree Cricket Club, Prestbury, which is in his constituency.

References

External links
 David Rutley MP official website

 Conservative Party biography

1961 births
Living people
Alumni of the London School of Economics
Harvard Business School alumni
UK MPs 2010–2015
UK MPs 2015–2017
UK MPs 2017–2019
UK MPs 2019–present
Conservative Party (UK) MPs for English constituencies
English Latter Day Saints
English Mormon missionaries
Mormon missionaries in England
20th-century Mormon missionaries
People educated at Priory School, Lewes
Free Enterprise Group